The 31st TCA Awards were held on August 8, 2015, in a ceremony hosted by James Corden at The Beverly Hilton in Beverly Hills, California. The nominees were announced by the Television Critics Association on June 4, 2015.

Winners and nominees

Multiple wins 
The following shows received multiple wins:

Shows with multiple nominations 

The following shows received multiple nominations:

References

External links
Official website

2015 television awards
2015 in American television
TCA Awards ceremonies